Terminal 2–Humphrey station is a light rail station is on the Metro Blue Line. It is the fifteenth stop southbound.

This is an island platform station and is typically accessed via a partially covered walkway from Terminal 2 of the Minneapolis–Saint Paul International Airport, also known as the Humphrey Terminal. Service began at this station when the second phase of the Blue Line opened on December 4, 2004.

The southern portal to the tunnels underneath the airport is located just to the north of this station. Service between this station and Terminal 1–Lindbergh station is free to passengers and operates 24 hours a day. The Blue Line is the main mode of transportation to transfer between terminals.

The station closed on September 9, 2006, to allow for the construction of a new parking garage. It reopened on September 8, 2007.

Notable places nearby 
 Minneapolis–Saint Paul International Airport
 Fort Snelling National Cemetery

References

External links 
Metro Transit: Terminal 2-Humphrey Station

Airport railway stations in the United States
Railway stations in the United States opened in 2004
2004 establishments in Minnesota
Metro Blue Line (Minnesota) stations in Hennepin County, Minnesota
Minneapolis–Saint Paul International Airport